Emmanuel Yao Adzator is a Ghanaian security expert. He was appointed by President John Dramani Mahama as the Director General of the Ghana Prisons Service. He was succeeded by Patrick Darko Missah in March 2017.

Education 
Emmanuel Adzator had his second cycle education at Kpando Secondary School. He was admitted to the University of Ghana and graduated with a Degree in Psychology. He holds a diploma in Human Resource Management from the Ghana Institute of Management and Public Administration.

Career 
Emmanuel Adzator was enlisted into the Ghana Prisons Service in April 1989. Whiles at the service he had several training in the corrections system including Correctional Reforms, Re-Entry and Reintegration at Joyfields Training Institute in Las Vegas, Nevada and Advanced Prisons Management, from the Galilee Management Institute, Israel.

Adzator has headed several prisons in Ghana including Nsawam Medium Security Prisons and Obuasi Local Prisons. He became the Ashanti Regional Regional Prisons Commander. He was the General Staff Officer as well as the Criminal Records Officer at the Prisons Headquarters.

Director General of Ghana Prisons Service 
In January 2015 he was promoted from a deputy director of Prisons to Director of Prisons along with other  superior prison offices. In March 2016, then President of Ghana, John Mahama, upon the advise of the Prisons Service Council, appointed him as Acting Director General of the Ghana Prisons Service. Prior to his appointment, he was the Deputy Director General of Prisons in charge of Finance and Administration. He was succeeded by Patrick Missah in 2017.

References 

Living people
People from Volta Region
Ghana Institute of Management and Public Administration alumni
University of Ghana alumni
Year of birth missing (living people)
Ghanaian Director Generals of Prisons